The 1994 VMI Keydets football team was an American football team that represented the Virginia Military Institute (VMI) as a member of the Southern Conference (SoCon) during the 1994 NCAA Division I-AA football season. In their first year under head coach Bill Stewart, the team compiled an overall record of 1–10, with a mark of 1–7 in conference play, placing ninth in the SoCon. In December 1993 Stewart was introduced as the 26th all-time head coach of the Keydets after serving as an assistant at Air Force.

Schedule

References

VMI
VMI Keydets football seasons
VMI Keydets football